Mary Dockray-Miller (born 1965) is an American scholar of early medieval England, best known for her work on gender in the pre-Conquest period. She has published on female saints, on Beowulf, and on religious women. She teaches at Lesley University, where she is professor of English.

Dockray-Miller is the author of Motherhood and Mothering in Anglo-Saxon England (St. Martin's Press, 2000), which utilized postmodern gender theory (the work of Judith Butler, Luce Irigaray, and others) to reinvestigate historical elements, such as double houses and early English religious women, and literature, including Beowulf. At the time, it was "the first and only monograph on motherhood to appear in Anglo-Saxon studies". The book received a fair amount of attention from reviewers, though opinions were mixed, one reviewer stating that "her historical analyses, however, are unsatisfying and problematic" and that Dockray-Miller too easily conflates patriarchy with heroic society. On the other hand, a reviewer in Speculum praised the book as "well argued and an important contribution to women's studies and Anglo-Saxon scholarship". One reviewer pointed out flaws and strengths: "Yet such problematic moments [renaming Grendel's Mother "the seawolf", and excluding Elene and Mary from her discussion of mothers] are offset by the books more sustained strengths: an exciting and original topic whose exploration raises awareness of motherhood in an early culture, and a persuasive thesis that is supported by fascinating historical analysis." Her chapter on mothers in Beowulf was considered "intriguing and persuasive" by one reviewer, but with the caveat that the conclusion on the politics of motherhood was "sketchy".

She edited the Wilton Chronicle in Saints Edith and Æthelthryth: Princesses, Miracle Workers, and their Late Medieval Audience (Brepols, 2009). She has published numerous journal articles and is a contributor to the Historical Dictionary of Women's Education in the United States (Greenwood, 1998).

Publications 
 Public Medievalists, Racism, and Suffrage in the American Women's College (Palgrave, 2017). 
 The Books and the Life of Judith of Flanders. Burlington, VT: Ashgate Publishing, 2015.
 “Old English Has A Serious Image Problem” JSTOR Daily 3 May 2017.
 Saints Edith and Æthelthryth: Princesses, Miracle Workers, and their Late Medieval Audience. Medieval Women: Texts and Contexts vol.25. (Turnhout: Brepols, 2009).
 "Old English Literacy, the Digital Revolution, and New Media Aliteracy" The Heroic Age 14.1 (2010).
 "The St. Edith Cycle in the Salisbury Breviary"  Fifteenth-Century Studies 34 (2009): 48-63.

References

External links
Mary Dockray-Miller profile Lesley University website

Living people
Anglo-Saxon studies scholars
Lesley University faculty
Gender studies academics
1965 births